Wang Di (born 1993) is a retired professional wushu taolu athlete from China. He is a one-time world champion and gold medalist at the 2016 Taolu World Cup and the 2014 Asian Games. He won the gold medal in the nanquan all-around event at the 2017 National Games of China as well as the title, "The King of Routines." After his competitive career, Wang became a physical education teacher at Zhejiang University.

See also 

 List of Asian Games medalists in wushu

References 

1993 births
Living people
Chinese wushu practitioners
Wushu practitioners at the 2014 Asian Games
Asian Games medalists in wushu
Asian Games gold medalists for China
Medalists at the 2014 Asian Games